Chief Menominee Memorial Site is a historic site located in West Township, Marshall County, Indiana.  The memorial site was dedicated in 1909, and includes a triangular park, remains of the replica chapel foundation stones, and the Chief Menominee Monument.  The log replica chapel was destroyed by fire in 1920.  The Chief Menominee Monument is a 17-foot tall granite monument dedicated to the memory of Chief Menominee. It is the first monument to a Native American erected under a state or federal legislative enactment.

It was listed on the National Register of Historic Places in 2010.

References

 Monuments and memorials on the National Register of Historic Places in Indiana
Buildings and structures completed in 1909
1909 establishments in Indiana
Buildings and structures in Marshall County, Indiana
National Register of Historic Places in Marshall County, Indiana